Corynoptera uncata is a species of fungus gnat found in the British Isles.

References

Further reading
 Hippa, Heikki, Pekka Vilkamaa, and Kai Heller. "Review of the Holarctic Corynoptera Winnertz, 1867, s. str.(Diptera, Sciaridae)." Zootaxa 2695 (2010): 1-197.

External links

ADW

Sciaridae
Insects described in 2006